B.J. Sams may refer to:

B. J. Sams (American football), football player
B. J. Sams (television), news anchor in Little Rock, Arkansas